Kim Sun-kee is a South Korean physicist. He is professor in Seoul National University and director of the Korea Invisible Mass Search. He was the first director of the Rare Isotope Science Project within the Institute for Basic Science and is a member of the Korean Academy of Science and Technology.

Education
 1979−1983: BS, Korea University
 1983−1985: MS, Korea University
 1985−1988: Ph.D. Korea University

Work
Positions held
1988−1990: Research Associate, KEK, Japan
1990−1992: Senior Research Associate, Rutgers University
1992−1996: Assistant Professor, Seoul National University
1996−2002: Associate Professor, Seoul National University
2002−present: Professor, Seoul National University
2011−present: Director, Rare Isotope Science Project, Institute for Basic Science
1995−1995: Visiting Scientist, Fermi National Accelerator Laboratory
1999−1999: Visiting Scientist, KEK

Major research activities
1985−1996: AMY experiment, TRISTAN, KEK  e+e- collider experiment
1990−1992: E799, Rare Kaon decay experiment, Fermilab
1994−1998: D0 experiment, TEVATRON, Fermilab
1994−2011: BELLE experiment, KEKB, KEK
1996−2000: ATIC, balloon borne experiment, NASA
2000−2011: Korea Invisible Mass Search (spokesperson), South Korea
  
Professional service activities
1992−1994: Korea SSC committee
1994−2001: Executive board, Belle Collaboration
1996−1998: Investigators Consultative Group between Korea-NASA 
1998−2001: Organizing committee, World Wide Study on Physics and Detector at LC
2000−2006: Director of Dark Matter Research Center 
2001−2002: Advisory committee, Proton Therapy Center at National Cancer Center
2005−2009: Chair, Association of Korean High Energy Physicists
2006−2012: Committee for the Promotion of Korea-CERN Collaboration, MEST
2008−present: International Detector Advisory Group of ILC
2009−2010: Chair, Particle Physics Division, Korean Physical Society
2011−2011: Steering Committee for Heavy Ion Accelerator, MEST
2012−2014: National Committee for Fusion Research, MEST 
2012−2014: R&D Policy Advisory Committee, National Fusion Research Institute

Awards
1991: SSC Fellow, TNRLC
2006: Koshiba prize, Foundation for High Energy Accelerator Science, Japan
2008: Scientist of the month, Ministry of Education, Science and Technology of South Korea
2008: SNU Award for Excellent Research

Selected list of publications

Physics

Instrumentation

References

^www.sciencemag.org Science VOL 317 6 JULY 2007
^PRL 99, 091301 (2007) Physical Review Letters

Korea University alumni
South Korean physicists
Living people
1960 births